Live! was an Italian music television channel, carried in Italy on Sky Italia. It broadcast only recorded concerts.

References

External links
 

Music television channels
Television channels and stations established in 2009
Television channels and stations disestablished in 2012
Defunct television channels in Italy
Italian-language television stations
2009 establishments in Italy
2012 disestablishments in Italy
Music organisations based in Italy